Carbazole 1,9a-dioxygenase (CARDO) is an enzyme with systematic name 9H-carbazole,NAD(P)H:oxygen oxidoreductase (2,3-hydroxylating). This enzyme catalyses the following chemical reaction

 9H-carbazole + NAD(P)H + H+ + O2  2'-aminobiphenyl-2,3-diol + NAD(P)+

Carbazole 1,9a-dioxygenase catalyses the first reaction in the pathway of carbazole degradation.

References

External links 
 

EC 1.14.12